Ayesha Akter is a Bangladeshi film actress. She won the Bangladesh National Film Award for Best Supporting Actress for her role in the film Rajanigandha (1982).

Filmography
 The Father (1979)
 Rajanigandha (1982)
 Nodir Naam Modhumoti (1995)

Awards

References

External links
 

Living people
Bangladeshi film actresses
Best Supporting Actress National Film Award (Bangladesh) winners
Year of birth missing (living people)